The smallest organisms found on Earth can be determined according to various aspects of organism size, including volume, mass, height, length, or genome size.
 
Given the incomplete nature of scientific knowledge, it is possible that the smallest organism is undiscovered. Furthermore, there is some debate over the definition of life, and what entities qualify as organisms; consequently the smallest known organism (microorganism) is debatable.

Microorganisms

Obligate endosymbiotic bacteria 
The genome of Nasuia deltocephalinicola, a symbiont of the European pest leafhopper, Macrosteles quadripunctulatus, consists of a circular chromosome of 112,031 base pairs.

The genome of Nanoarchaeum equitans is 490,885 nucleotides long.

Pelagibacter ubique 

They also have the smallest free-living bacterium genome: 1.3 Mbp, 1354 protein genes, 35 RNA genes. They are one of the most common and smallest organisms in the ocean, with their total weight exceeding that of all fish in the sea.

Mycoplasma genitalium 
Mycoplasma genitalium, a parasitic bacterium which lives in the primate bladder, waste disposal organs, genital, and respiratory tracts, is thought to be the smallest known organism capable of independent growth and reproduction. With a size of approximately 200 to 300 nm, M. genitalium is an ultramicrobacterium, smaller than other small bacteria, including rickettsia and chlamydia. However, the vast majority of bacterial strains have not been studied, and the marine ultramicrobacterium Sphingomonas sp. strain RB2256 is reported to have passed through a  ultrafilter. A complicating factor is nutrient-downsized bacteria, bacteria that become much smaller due to a lack of available nutrients.

Nanoarchaeum 

Nanoarchaeum equitans is a species of microbe  in diameter. It was discovered in 2002 in a hydrothermal vent off the coast of Iceland by Karl Stetter. A thermophile that grows in near-boiling temperatures, Nanoarchaeum appears to be an obligatory symbiont on the archaeon Ignicoccus; it must be in contact with the host organism to survive. Guinness World Records recognizes Nanoarchaeum equitans as the smallest living organism.

Eukaryotes (Eukaryota) 
Prasinophyte algae of the genus Ostreococcus are the smallest free-living eukaryote.

Viruses 
Some biologists consider viruses to be non-living because they lack a cellular structure and cannot metabolize by themselves, requiring a host cell to replicate and synthesize new products. Some hold that, because viruses do have genetic material and can employ the metabolism of their host, they can be considered organisms. Also, an emerging concept that is gaining traction among some virologists is that of the virocell, in which the actual phenotype of a virus is the infected cell, and the virus particle (or virion) is merely a reproductive or dispersal stage, much like pollen or a spore.

The smallest viruses in terms of genome size are single-stranded DNA (ssDNA) viruses. Perhaps the most famous is the bacteriophage Phi-X174 with a genome size of 5,386 nucleotides. However, some ssDNA viruses can be even smaller. However, the two capsids making up the virus are fused; divided, the capsids would be  in length. Other environmentally characterized ssDNA viruses such as CRESS DNA viruses, among others, can have genomes that are considerably less than 2,000 nucleotides.

The smallest RNA virus in terms of genome size is phage BZ13 strain T72 at 3,393 nucleotides length. Viruses using both DNA and RNA in their replication (retroviruses) range in size from 7,040 to 12,195 nucleotides. It is important to consider other self-replicating genetic elements, such as satelliviruses, viroids and ribozymes.

Animals (Animalia) 
One of the smallest species (Myxobolus shekel) is no more than  when fully grown, making it the smallest known animal.

Molluscs (Molluska)

Bivalvia 

Gastropods (Gastropoda) 

The smallest water snail (of all snails) is Ammonicera minortalis in North America, originally described from Cuba. It measures .

The smallest land snail is Acmella nana. Discovered in Borneo, and described in November 2015, it measures . The previous record was that of Angustopila dominikae from China, which was reported in September 2015. This snail measures .

Cephalopods (Cephalopoda) 

Maximites was the smallest known ammonoid. Adult specimens reached only  in shell diameter.

Arthropods (Arthropoda)

Arachnids (Arachnida) 
 There is a debate about which spider is smallest. Males of both species are potentially smaller than the females, but no Anapistula ataecina or Anapistula caecula have been measured yet.
 Cochlodispus minimus is the smallest mite. However, PBS claims "The tiniest mite on record is 82 microns long" but does not name a species.

Non-hexapod crustaceans (Crustacea) 

Insects (Insecta) 
These are among the tiniest non-parasitic insects.

Echinoderms (Echinodermata) 
The smallest sea cucumber, and also the smallest echinoderm, is Psammothuria ganapati, a synaptid that lives between sand grains on the coast of India.

Sea urchins 

Starfish 

Fish (Pisces) 

This fish, a member of the carp family, has a translucent body and a head unprotected by a skeleton.
 One of the smallest fish based on the minimum size at maturity is Schindleria brevipinguis from Australia, their females reach  and males . This fish, a member of the goby family, differs from similar members of the group in having its first anal fin ray further forward, under dorsal fin 4.
 Male individuals of the anglerfish species Photocorynus spiniceps have been documented to be  at maturity, and thus claimed to be a smaller species.

Amphibians (Amphibia)

Frogs and toads (Anura) 

Other very small frogs include Brachycephalus didactylus from Brazil (reported as ), several species of Eleutherodactylus such as E. iberia (around ) and E. limbatus and Eleutherodactylus orientalis from Cuba, Gardiner's Frog Sechellophryne gardineri from the Seychelles (up to ), several species of Stumpffia such as S. tridactyla and S. pygmaea (males ;) and Wakea madinika from Madagascar. Paedophryne swiftorum (body length ) is not included in the smallest vertebrates known with other nine species of frogs. The two species Microhyla borneensis and Arthroleptella rugosa were once the smallest known frogs from the Old World. In general these extremely small frogs occur in tropical forest and montane environments. There is relatively little data on size variation among individuals, growth from metamorphosis to adulthood or size variation among populations in these species. Additional studies and the discovery of further minute frog species are likely to change the rank order of this list.

Salamanders, newts and allies (Urodela) 

Sauropsids (Sauropsida)

Lizards and snakes (Squamata) 

S. ariasae was first described in 2001 by the biologists Blair Hedges and Richard Thomas. This dwarf gecko lives in Jaragua National Park in the Dominican Republic and on Beata Island (Isla Beata), off the southern coast of the Dominican Republic.

 One of the smallest known snakes  is the recently discovered Barbados threadsnake (Leptotyphlops carlae).

Turtles and tortoises (Testudines) 
The smallest turtle is the speckled padloper tortoise (Homopus signatus) from South Africa. The males measure , while females measure up to almost .

Crocodiles and close relatives (Crocodylomorpha) 
 The smallest extant crocodilian is the Cuvier's dwarf caiman (Paleosuchus palpebrosus) from northern and central South America.
 Some extinct crocodylomorphs were even smaller.

Pterosaurs (Pterosauria) 

Non-avian dinosaurs (Dinosauria) 

Sizes of non-avian dinosaurs are commonly labelled with a level of uncertainty, as the available material often (or even usually) is incomplete. The smallest known extinct dinosaur is Anchiornis, a genus of feathered dinosaur that lived in what is now China during the Late Jurassic Period 160 to 155 million years ago. However, in 2022 its holotype was concluded to represent a juvenile individual.

Birds (Aves) 

Called the zunzuncito in its native habitat on Cuba, it is lighter than a Canadian or U.S. penny. It is said that it is "more apt to be mistaken for a bee than a bird". The bee hummingbird eats half its total body mass and drinks eight times its total body mass each day.
 The smallest waterfowl is pygmy goose (Nettapus). The second smallest waterfowl is the extinct Mioquerquedula from the Miocene.

Non-mammalian synapsids (Synapsida) 

Mammals (Mammalia)

Marsupials (Marsupialia) 
The smallest marsupial is the long-tailed planigale from Australia. The Pilbara ningaui is considered to be of similar size and weight.

Shrews (Eulipotyphla) 

Bats (Chiroptera) 

Carnivorans (Carnivora) 

Rodents (Rodentia) 

Primates (Primates) 

Cetaceans (Cetacea) 
The smallest cetacean, which is also (as of 2006) the most endangered, is the vaquita, a species of porpoise.

Plants (Plantae)

Gymnosperms (Gymnospermae) 
Zamia pygmaea is a cycad found in Cuba, and the smallest known gymnosperm.

Angiosperms (Angiospermae) 

Duckweeds of the genus Wolffia are the smallest angiosperms. Fully grown, they measure  and reach a mass of just 150 µg.

Dicotyledons 
The smallest known dicotyledon plant is the Himalayan dwarf mistletoe (Arceuthobium minutissimum).

Other

Nanobes 
Nanobes are thought by some scientists to be the smallest known organisms, 
about one tenth the size of the smallest known bacteria. Nanobes, tiny filamental structures first found in some rocks and sediments, were first described in 1996 by Philippa Uwins of the University of Queensland, but it is unclear what they are, and if they are alive.

See also 
 Largest organisms
 Largest prehistoric organisms

References

External links 
 Featherwing beetles on the UF / IFAS Featured Creatures Web site

Organism size
Biological records

es:Tamaño de los seres vivos